Rephlex Records was a record label launched in 1991 in Cornwall by electronic musician Richard D. James (aka Aphex Twin) and Grant Wilson-Claridge. The label coined the term braindance to describe the output of Aphex Twin and fellow artists.

History
In 1989, Grant Wilson-Claridge met Richard D. James (a.k.a. Aphex Twin) DJing at The Bowgie, a club located just along the coast from Newquay, Cornwall. According to Wilson-Claridge, back in 1989, "the Bowgie was the best club ever...this was before Newquay turned into the Cornish Ibiza" and it was very difficult to hear new and interesting music. Wilson-Claridge and James used to DJ on alternate weeks. When he noticed that James was playing his own tapes rather than records, Wilson-Claridge suggested that they press up some records. In the beginning, committing Aphex Twin recordings to vinyl was a way of making music the duo's friends wanted to hear. Due to their geographical dis-location they did not have access to the music they wanted to hear and so they decided to create their own, and Rephlex as a label was born. Although the label was founded in 1991 in Cornwall, it moved the year after to London.

On a post to an internet newsgroup in 1992, the label stated that its intent was to "promote Innovation in the dynamics of Acid" – a much loved and misunderstood genre of house music" and to "demonstrate to the rest of the world that British dance music can be entirely original".

Rephlex has released the music of many notable and influential electronic artists, among them Mike Paradinas, DMX Krew, Luke Vibert, and Squarepusher. The label has also remastered and re-released the early works of its acid heroes 808 State and The Future Sound of London, and relaunched the career of electronic duo producers Black Devil with a re-release of their first record.

In 2014, James announced the closing of Rephlex Records. James stated that the closure was "something that needed to be done a long time ago. Me and my friend would have drifted apart, but actually the label did keep us together. It got to a point where I’d actually rather be his friend than be in business with him."

Roster

808 State
Arpanet
Baby Ford
Black Devil
Bochum Welt
Bodenstandig 2000
Brian Dougans
The Bug
Ceephax Acid Crew
Chimera
The Criminal Minds
Cylob
D'Arcangelo
Dabrye
DMX Krew
Dopplereffekt
Drexciya
Ensemble
 EOD
The Gentle People
Global Goon
hecker
Richard D. James (including releases as AFX, Aphex Twin, Bradley Strider, Caustic Window, and The Tuss)
 Jodey Kendrick
JP Buckle
Kosmik Kommando
Leila
The Lisa Carbon Trio
Ovuca (including releases as Aleksi Perälä)
P.P. Roy
Bogdan Raczynski
Seefeel
Squarepusher (including releases as Chaos A.D.)
Urban Tribe
Universal Indicator (collective)
μ-Ziq
Wisp
Luke Vibert (including releases as Amen Andrews)
Vulva
Yee-King

See also 
 Lists of record labels
 List of electronic music record labels
 Rephlex Records discography

References

External links 
 Rephlex Records at Discogs.com

Aphex Twin
Electronic music record labels
British record labels
Record labels established in 1991
1991 establishments in the United Kingdom